Arizona Robbins, M.D., F.A.C.S. is a fictional character on the ABC television series Grey's Anatomy, portrayed by Jessica Capshaw. She was introduced in the show's fifth season as an attending surgeon and the new chief of pediatric surgery. Originally contracted to appear in three episodes, Capshaw's contract was extended to the remainder of the fifth season, and she became a series regular in the sixth season.

Robbins has been characterized as "quirky" and "perky" and is well known for wearing wheely sneakers and a Holly Hobbie pink scrub cap, intended to appeal to her young patients. She was established as a love interest for orthopedic resident Callie Torres (Sara Ramirez) after Torres' storyline with Erica Hahn (Brooke Smith) was cut short due to what series creator Shonda Rhimes called "a lack of chemistry". Shonda Rhimes was, in contrast, pleased with the chemistry between Robbins and Torres, citing the addition of Capshaw to the cast as an element of the season of which Rhimes was most proud. Initial media reaction to the character was positive. Matt Mitovich of TV Guide described her as a "fan favorite", and Chris Monfette for IGN praised the addition of "fresh, new characters" such as Robbins over the course of the season.

Along with Sarah Drew, Capshaw was fired in March 2018 for "creative" reasons regarding cast changes 10 seasons into playing the character. Shonda Rhimes alluded to the impact Capshaw's character had representing the LGBTQ community. She praised both actresses for "bringing these characters to life with such vibrant performance and for inspiring women around the globe". The decision was controversial, sparking backlash from fans and further speculation about the connection of their firing with Ellen Pompeo's new $20 million contract a year for the show. Showrunner Krista Vernoff stated, however, that the decision was purely creative, not budgetary. Capshaw made a statement, explaining the significance Robbins had on fans: "She was one of the first members of the LGBTQ community to be represented in a series regular role on network television. Her impact on the world is permanent and forever. Forever."

Storylines
Following the death of Dr. Jordan Kenley (John Sloman), Chief Webber (James Pickens, Jr.) replaces his head of pediatric surgery with Dr. Arizona Robbins, a graduate of the Johns Hopkins School of Medicine. Robbins has a romantic interest in orthopedic fifth-year resident Callie Torres (Sara Ramirez) and later goes on to kiss her. The two embark on a relationship, but when Torres' father, Carlos (Héctor Elizondo), learns of the relationship, he threatens to cut her off financially unless Torres returns home with him. When Torres' father returns to Seattle and continues to reject his daughter's sexuality, Robbins is able to convince him to reconsider. She tells Mr. Torres that her father was able to accept her own sexuality, as she promised him she was still the "good man in a storm" he raised her to be, and that Torres is still the same person Mr. Torres raised. Torres is dismayed to learn that Robbins does not want children, and the two come to a conclusion that they cannot continue their relationship, since they both want different things. However, after a shooter enters Seattle Grace with a vendetta for Derek Shepherd (Patrick Dempsey), Lexie Grey (Chyler Leigh), and Richard Webber (James Pickens, Jr.), they are in lockdown together, and the two reconcile.

Robbins receives word that she has been given a grant to go to Malawi, and become a doctor there. In the end, Torres is shown to have accepted this as well and has decided to leave with Robbins. However, a fight at the airport results in Robbins leaving for Malawi without Torres, ending their relationship. She returns, hoping to rekindle her relationship with Torres, but is initially rejected. Eventually, Torres reveals that she is pregnant with Mark Sloan (Eric Dane)'s baby. Robbins accepts the situation, and she and Torres restart their relationship. Torres gifts Robbins with a weekend getaway, and Robbins proposes to Torres. After proposing, the two get in a car crash leaving Torres in critical condition. A series of surgeries follows, including the delivery of her premature baby, along with emotional breakdowns of both Sloan and Robbins. Upon the awakening of Torres, she accepts her marriage proposal, and the two are married by Miranda Bailey (Chandra Wilson). As the fifth year residents are coming close to the end of their residency, Robbins urges Alex Karev (Justin Chambers) to work under her. At the end of the season 8, Robbins is hurt badly in a plane crash, resulting in her left leg being amputated. In the aftermath of the plane accident, in which Sloan and Lexie Grey were killed, the hospital is sued and eventually found liable for negligence. Each victim including Shepherd, Meredith Grey (Ellen Pompeo), Cristina Yang (Sandra Oh), and Robbins herself must receive $15 million of compensation, which leads the hospital to a near bankruptcy as the insurance companies refuse to pay. Those doctors and Callie buy the hospital with the help of the Harper-Avery Foundation to prevent it from closing, and each become members of the new directing board. Robbins is initially cold towards Callie because she was the one who decided for an amputation. She also struggles with body image issues, but they slowly reconcile as Robbins tries to adapt to her new life. When Dr. Lauren Boswell (Hilarie Burton) arrives at the hospital to reconstruct the face of a baby and flirts with Robbins, she is flattered that a stranger still finds her attractive despite knowing about her injury and the two have a one-night stand.

After finding out that Arizona cheated on her with Lauren, Callie kicks Arizona out of their apartment. They also let out their true feelings about the accident and more is revealed about how they actually have felt. Callie initially agrees to couples therapy, but she shows up at the office only to tell Arizona that she isn't going in. Arizona gets drunk with April for a laugh while Callie attends a fundraiser. Arizona is led to believe that she and Leah slept together, however all they did was dance and make grilled cheese sandwiches after watching Derek perform surgery on film. Arizona pursues a sexual relationship with Leah but cuts ties with her when Callie asks her to come back home. It is revealed that Arizona became pregnant via a sperm donor prior to sleeping with Lauren, but later miscarried. They decided to try again for a second child, but after agreeing that Callie would carry it, Callie went to see an OB/GYN and discovered that she had developed adhesions in her uterus since Sofia's birth, meaning she can't carry any more children. When she told Arizona, Arizona offered to carry the baby, but Callie decided that since they're still on unsteady footing that if something goes wrong, they won't make it and she doesn't want to put them in that position. They agree to postpone their plans to have another baby. However, in the season finale of Season 10 it is implied that Callie and Arizona's dream of having another child may come by means of a surrogate. At the beginning of Season 11, Callie and Arizona decide to have a baby by surrogate and Arizona applies for a fetal surgery fellowship with Dr. Herman. Arizona, with a heavy workload because of the fellowship, and Callie have an argument in the waiting room, and they choose to go to therapy together, resulting in a 30-day break. Arizona believes that the break strengthened their relationship and made her realize that she needs Callie - Callie on the other hand declares that the break gave her a taste of the freedom that she has been missing. Callie walks away and the two get a divorce later.

Callie wants to take Sofia and move to New York with Penny but Arizona does not want to be separated from her daughter so she hires a lawyer and they go to court for a custody battle. After a long case, Arizona wins sole custody of Sofia, but in the end she ends up sharing Sofia with Callie because she thinks that 'both of Sofia's moms deserve to be happy'.

Callie is referenced occasionally by Arizona and Sofia after her departure from the show. In season 14, Sofia moves back with Arizona because she misses her but also frequently misses Callie. Arizona starts a research project to figure out why mother mortality rates are so high in the US versus other countries. At the conclusion of season 14, Arizona departs the show to move to New York to be with Sofia and Callie and the two reconcile.

Development

Casting and creation

It was first reported in December 2008 that Capshaw would be joining the cast of Grey's Anatomy as pediatric surgeon Arizona Robbins, for a multi-episode arc. Capshaw was initially scheduled to appear in only three episodes of the show's fifth season, but series creator Shonda Rhimes later extended Capshaw's contract to appear in all of the season's remaining episodes, becoming a series regular in the sixth season. Speaking of the new addition, Rhimes said:

This promotion saw Robbins become the only lesbian series regular on primetime TV. Robbins is described as "quirky [and] perky" by TV Guide Matt Mitovich, and "a clear and rational surgeon who is not ruled by her emotions" by Kris De Leon of BuddyTV. William Harper, writer of the episode "Beat Your Heart Out" in which Robbins and Torres kiss for the first time, has deemed Robbins: "genuinely, positively interested in people, in the most selfless way." Commenting on Robbins' confidence, Capshaw commented: "she never thinks she's wrong and you don't hate her for it. There's no ego though, she just always thinks she's right and she is." She is portrayed as having "wacky tendencies", including wearing roller shoes to work.

Characterization 

The American Broadcasting Company (ABC) characterized Robbins as "confident", "ambitious", and "cheerful". Shortly after her arrival in the show, Robbins became a love-interest for Torres (Ramirez). The relationship between the two is referred to by fans by the portmanteau "Calzona". Torres' previous girlfriend Erica Hahn (Brooke Smith) was written out of Grey's Anatomy in 2008, due to a lack of chemistry between the characters. Rhimes praised the chemistry between Robbins and Torres in contrast, comparing it to that between the show's primary couple Meredith Grey (Ellen Pompeo) and Shepherd (Dempsey), and stating: "They have that little thing that makes you want to watch them." Rhimes named the addition of Capshaw to the cast as one of the elements of the season she was most proud of, commenting that she wished she could have found Callie a love interest that "sparkled" sooner, but was pleased with eventually having found one in Robbins.

When Robbins turned Torres down in the episode "An Honest Mistake" due to her inexperience with women, series writer Peter Nowalk offered the insight:

Although the characters go on to begin a relationship, the show's one-hundredth episode "What a Difference a Day Makes" sees them experience difficulties as a result of Torres' father rejecting her for her sexuality. Rhimes commented on their ultimate reconciliation: "I love [Callie] with Arizona. [...] I like that they make me feel hopeful about love." Rhimes has said of their relationship in the sixth season: "I would like to see Callie happily in a long-term relationship. We have so much to explore with them, because we barely know anything about [Arizona]." Capshaw has characterized the relationship as "incredibly understanding and compassionate and sensitive". She described the sixth season as being about: "cementing a very mature and grounded relationship and taking it forward. This is a drama, of course; there will be conflict, but for the time being, they're enjoying being in a relationship that seems stable."

Asked whether Robbins and Torres might marry in the future, Capshaw replied: "There's probably a lot more stuff that has to happen before that happens. [...] I don't think they're going to get married just to get married. As Arizona goes, I think she has incredible discipline and she does, as you said, have a very strict moral compass and marriage would not be something she would jump into without giving it a great amount of thought." Discussing Robbins' relationship with Torres' former lover Sloan, Capshaw divulged: "Whenever there's been a chance to play that I am intimidated by him or being standoffish, I've always chosen to make it very playful. It's much more Arizona's style to find it very amusing."

Reception

Robbins ranked seventh in a top ten list of gay characters on TV compiled by Jane Boursaw of TV Squad:  Commenting on Hahn's abrupt departure from the show, Dorothy Snarker, writing for LGBT website AfterEllen.com observed of Robbins and Torres' relationship: "I [...] can't help but be wary of how the Grey's writers will handle this relationship. Jessica has proven lovely and likable in her brief screen time so far. But it's not how the romance starts, but what happens next that really matters." AfterEllen.com also included Robbins in their poll of the Top 50 Lesbian and Bisexual Characters, ranking her at No. 3 and in their Top 50 Favorite Female TV Characters, placing her at No. 2.

Matt Mitovich of TV Guide noted that Robbins "quickly established herself as a fan favorite", describing her as: "a breath of fresh air in the often angsty halls of Seattle Grace." Chris Monfette for IGN has opinionated that the fifth season of Grey's Anatomy was an improvement on the previous two seasons, attributing this in part to the introduction of "fresh, new characters" Robbins and Owen Hunt (Kevin McKidd). Monfette wrote that Arizona's ultimate contribution to the season was "introducing the element of childcare to Seattle Grace", which in turn gave Miranda Bailey (Chandra Wilson) "a great arc". Jennifer Godwin for E! Online approved of Arizona's season six promotion to a series regular, particularly as it meant the continuation of her relationship with Callie.

The Los Angeles Times Carina MacKenzie wrote of the sixth-season episode "Invasion":

References
Specific

General

External links 
Grey's Anatomy at ABC.com

Grey's Anatomy characters
Fictional lesbians
Fictional surgeons
Television characters introduced in 2009
Fictional amputees
Fictional female doctors
Fictional LGBT characters in television
Female characters in television